Iyabo Veronica Anishulowo (née Ajibogun) is a Nigerian educator and elder stateswoman who served the Federal Government of Nigeria at many levels, she is one of the most prominent female political personalities and proponents of gender equality in Africa. She rose through the ranks from grass root level as a teacher to serve as a Federal Minister and Senator.

Iyabo Anisulowo is described a Liberal Conservative because of her pro-family values and feminine independence through universal quality education stance when she served in the Senate, she is an 'Afropolitan Feminist'.

State politics
Anishulowo joined politics in 1991 when she was appointed Secretary to the Local Government in Ogun State. A year later, she became the Commissioner of the Ogun State Civil Service Commission. She also served as Commissioner for Agriculture, Rural Development and Water Resources and Minister of State for Education during General Sanni Abacha's regime. She however left the State Ministry for Education to contest for governorship under the Ogun State chapter of the All Peoples Party.

Senate
Anishulowo represented Ogun West in the Senate from 2003–2007. The former Senator is one of the members of the People's Democratic Party who defected to join the All Progressives Congress coalition. In October 15, 2004, following allegations that she withdrew N500,000 and N700,000 respectively from the pockets of the Senate Committee for State and Local Governments, Senato Anisulowo was physically assaulted by fellow Senator Isa Mohammed who represented to hardline conservative PDP of Niger West during the Olusegun Obasanjo Administration. She has of course denied this allegation saying the money was for the Interparliarmentary Union Meeting in Geneva, Switzerland that year. Iyabo Anishulowo has never been prosecuted or convicted of any crime.

Personal life
Anishulowo is married with children and lives in Ilaro the biggest metropolitan in the area she represented in the Senate.

References

All People's Party (Nigeria) politicians
All Progressives Congress politicians
Federal ministers of Nigeria
Living people
Members of the Senate (Nigeria)
Politicians from Ogun State
Year of birth missing (living people)
Yoruba women in politics
20th-century Nigerian politicians
20th-century Nigerian women politicians
21st-century Nigerian politicians
21st-century Nigerian women politicians
Women government ministers of Nigeria